Brantford Blast were a Canadian senior ice hockey team in the Ontario Hockey Association's Allan Cup Hockey, from Brantford, Ontario. The team was established in 2000, and played their games at the Brantford Civic Centre.

The Blast were the winners of the 2008 Allan Cup as Canadian Senior "AAA" Champions.

History
In 2000, the Ontario Hockey Association allowed for the expansion of the first Brantford team since 1987 into Ontario's top tier of Senior hockey. The Brantford Prowl competed during the 2000-01 Southwestern Senior A Hockey League season and finished in fifth place with a record of 12 wins, 17 losses, and a tie.  The team took 2001-02 off, but then re-emerged in 2002 as the Blast.

In 2002, Brantford rejoined the top tier of Ontario senior hockey this time known as the Brantford Blast. At the time, the city had the Brantford Golden Eagles in the Ontario Hockey Association, but had also lost teams, like the Brantford Alexanders of the Ontario Hockey League, who left in 1984 and the Brantford Smoke of the Colonial Hockey League, who left in 1998. The Blast would play their home games at the Brantford Civic Centre as well. The Blast have made it to the post season twice. In the 2005–06 season, when they won the league, but lost in the first round to the Dundas Real McCoys 4 games to 2. In the 2006–07 season, they placed third, defeating the Petrolia Squires 4 games to 3, and the Windsor St. Clair Saints 4 games to none to capture their first MLH Championship after a 4–3 win Monday March 12 in front of the home town crowd in Brantford.

Brantford won the J. Ross Robertson Cup for the league's playoffs championship in 2013 and 2014.

2008 Allan Cup
The Blast finished the 2007–08 season in second place.  They swept the Windsor St. Clair Saints 4-games-to-none in the Major League Hockey semi-final, but were defeated 4-games-to-2 to the Dundas Real McCoys.

The Brantford Blast were the host team of the 2008 Allan Cup, which was held in Brantford from April 14-April 19, 2008. This was also the 100th anniversary for the event, one of the reasons that the Blast wanted to host it.

The Brantford Blast became the first Ontario Hockey Association team since the Brantford Motts Clamatos, in 1987, to win the Allan Cup.  As hosts of the 2008 Allan Cup, the Blast failed to win their league and were allowed to bypass the OHA Final against the Whitby Dunlops and the Renwick Cup against the Thunder Bay Hawks.  After almost a months rest, the Blast competed at home for the Allan Cup and won the entire thing.  After suffering their only loss of the tournament to the Shawinigan Xtreme 3–2 in the first game, the Blast defeated the Bentley Generals 5–3 to clinch second in their division.  They defeated the Robertson Cup and EOSHL champion Whitby Dunlops in the quarter-final handily, 7–2.  They then knocked off the Major League Hockey and Renwick Cup champion Dundas Real McCoys in the semi-final 3–2 in overtime.  They met Bentley again in the final, who defeated the 2007 champions Lloydminster Border Kings and the Shawinigan Xtreme, and defeated them 3–1 to win the Canadian National Senior "AAA" crown.

Season-by-season record
''Note: GP = Games played, W = Wins, L = Losses, T = Ties, OTL = Overtime losses, Pts = Points, GF = Goals for, GA = Goals against

Awards
2004/2005 - All Star Centre - Paul Polillo
2004/2005 - Most Sportsmanlike - Tyler Pelton
November 2005 - Player of the Month - Adriano Fiacconi
December 2005 - Player of the Month - Tyler Pelton
2005-06 - League All-Star Game players - Tyler Pelton, Adriano Fiacconi, Brett Leggat
2005-06 - Season Champions
2005-06 - Best Team Goaltending
2006-07 - Major League Hockey Champions
2007-08 - Allan Cup Champions
2011-12 - Allan Cup Hockey - Robertson Cup Champions
2011-12 - Best Team Goaltending - Brett Leggat, Anthony Marshall, Ben Thomas
2011-12 - League Best player award - Mike Ruberto
2011-12 - League Leader Points - Mike Ruberto
2011-12 - League Best goaltender award - Brett Leggat
2011-12 - League Leader Goaltending - Brett Leggat
2012-13 - League Best goaltender award - Brett Leggat
2012-13 - League Leader Goltending - Brett Leggat
2013-14 - League Best goaltender award - Brett Leggat
2013-14 - League Most valuable player - Joel Prpic
2013-14 - League Leader Goaltending - Brett Leggat
2014-15 - League Best goaltender award - Anthony Marshall
2014-15 - League Leader Goltending - Anthony Marshall
2015-16 - League Best goaltender award - Brett Leggat
2015-16 - League Leader Goaltending - Brett Leggat

Notable alumni
Tyrone Garner
Brent Gretzky
Grant Ledyard
Jeff MacMillan
Joel Prpic
Steven Rice
Jason Williams

References

External links
Official web site

Ice hockey teams in Ontario
Senior ice hockey teams
Sport in Brantford
2000 establishments in Ontario
Ice hockey clubs established in 2000